Idle and Thackley is a ward in the metropolitan borough of the City of Bradford, West Yorkshire, England. It contains 131 listed buildings that are recorded in the National Heritage List for England.  Of these, two are listed at Grade II*, the middle of the three grades, and the others are at Grade II, the lowest grade.  As well as the villages of Idle and Thackley, the ward includes the villages of Apperley Bridge and Greengates, and the surrounding area.  The southern part of the ward is mainly residential, and the northern part is mainly rural.  Most of the listed buildings are houses, cottages and associated structures, farmhouses and farm buildings.  The other listed buildings include public houses, a church, a bridge, an archway to a former burial ground, a former toll house, a pair of locks on the Leeds and Liverpool Canal and an adjacent depot building, a war memorial, and a telephone kiosk.


Key

Buildings

References

Citations

Sources

 

Lists of listed buildings in West Yorkshire